Jæren is a traditional district in Rogaland county, Norway. The other districts in Rogaland are Dalane, Ryfylke, and Haugalandet. Jæren is one of the 15 districts that comprise Western Norway.

It includes the whole Stavanger Peninsula and the mainland area at its base. The coast is flat compared to the rest of the  mountainous Norwegian coast, and it has sandy beaches along most of the coastline. The largest urban area in Jæren is the adjoining cities of Stavanger/Sandnes (pop. 210,874 in 2015).

Economy
The petroleum industry around Stavanger is an important part of the economy of Jæren, with the headquarters of the country's largest oil company Equinor being located in Jæren, as well regional offices of international companies like ExxonMobil, Eni, Shell, ConocoPhillips, BP, Schlumberger, Halliburton, Baker Hughes, and several others. Jæren is also one of the most important agricultural areas of Norway, with a long crop period and varied and well-developed livestock production. Industry here is also strongly connected to the farming industry, with one of the largest producers of agricultural machines in the world, Kverneland Group, located in Time and Klepp.

Name
The name is identical with the word  which means "edge" or "brim". Several farms in Norway (around 30) have the same name. The name refers to the 60 km long coastline stretching from Brusand in the south to Tungenes in the north.

Location
Jæren is the largest flat lowland area in Norway. It comprises the coastline from the Stavanger Peninsula near the mouth of the great Boknafjorden all the way, south nearly to Egersund. Unlike most of the Norwegian coastline, there are very few offshore islands and few fjords cutting into the shoreline. Jærens rev (Jæren's reef) is a partly stony sandbar which extends almost 2 nautical miles (3.7 km) to the west in front of the Revtangen headland in Klepp municipality, the westernmost point of Jæren.

Municipalities
The geographical region of Jæren has eight municipalities:

Alternate descriptions
The geographical region of Jæren constitutes the above-mentioned municipalities, but the description of Jæren varies. Legally speaking, the Jæren District Court constitutes only the municipalities of Sandnes, Gjesdal, Forsand, Klepp, Time, and Hå. Some areas not traditionally in the area included in the district, and other areas are part of the Stavanger District Court.

Religiously speaking, the Jæren deanery constitutes the churches in the municipalities of Hå, Klepp, Time, and Gjesdal. Geographically speaking, the municipality of Gjesdal lies in the transition between Jæren and Dalane districts, but it is traditionally considered to be part of Jæren.

Confusion over the extent of the district is added by the fact that in everyday language, the name Jæren for most people does not include the towns of Stavanger and Sandnes but only the more rural area to the south.

Notable residents
 Erik Thorvaldsson (ca.950–ca.1000) better known as Erik the Red
 Arne Garborg (1851–1924) Author and Poet
 Alfie Haaland (1972-) Footballer
 Filip Ingebrigtsen (1993-) Distance Runner
 Jakob Ingebrigtsen (2000-) Distance Runner
 Erling Braut Haaland (2000-) Footballer

Gallery

See also
 Norwegian County Road 44, national tourist road for the region.

References

External links
 Nordsjøvegen 2003 (Explore Fjord Norway)
 Reisemål Jæren (only Norwegian)
 Store Norske Leksikon (only Norwegian)

 
Districts of Rogaland